The Rhythm of Love Tour was a music concert tour by American recording artist Anita Baker in 1994–1995, and supports her multi-platinum selling album, Rhythm of Love. The trek started on December 14, in New Orleans, visiting several cities in North America and Europe, the tour ended in late-December 1995.

Opening act
 George Duke  (London, UK)

Set list
"Sweet Love"
"Been So Long"
"Mystery"
"No One in the World"
"Same Ole Love (365 Days of Year)"
"Watch Your Step"
"Caught Up in the Rapture"
"Rhythm of Love" 1
"My Funny Valentine"
Diana Ross & Tina Turner Medley: "Stop! In the Name of Love" / "Proud Mary"
"Giving You the Best That I Got"
"Talk to Me"
"Rules" 1
"Fairy Tales"
"Body and Soul"
"You Belong to me"
Encore
"I Apologize"
"You Bring Me Joy"

1 performed only at select dates in North America and Europe.

Band
 Music Director/Drums: Ricky Lawson
 Guitar: John McCurry
 Bass/Cello: Nathan East
 Percussion: Joe Mardin
 Synth Bass: Luis Resto
 Background vocalists: Perri Sisters

Tour dates

References

External links
 www.AnitaBaker.com

Anita Baker concert tours
1994 concert tours
1995 concert tours